Events in the year 2018 in Cuba.

Incumbents
 First Secretary of the Communist Party of Cuba: Raúl Castro
 Second Secretary of the Communist Party of Cuba: José Ramón Machado Ventura
 President: Raúl Castro → Miguel Díaz-Canel
 First Vice President: Miguel Díaz-Canel → Salvador Valdés Mesa

Events
11 March – the 2018 Cuban parliamentary election is held.
19 April – Miguel Díaz-Canel is sworn in as President of the Council of State, marking the first time since 1959 that neither Castro brother is leading Cuba. Raúl Castro remained the First Secretary of the Communist Party of Cuba, the most senior position in the one-party socialist state.
21 April – Venezuelan President Nicolás Maduro is the first foreign leader to meet with President Miguel Díaz-Canel.
18 May – Cubana de Aviación Flight 972 crashes shortly after takeoff from the José Martí International Airport, killing all but one of the 113 people on board.

Deaths

12 January – Rudy Árias, baseball player (b. 1931).

1 February – Fidel Castro Díaz-Balart, nuclear physicist and government official (b. 1949)

4 March –  José Triana, 87, Cuban poet.

16 March – Milán Matos, 68, Cuban long jumper.

23 May – Luis Posada Carriles, Cuban terrorist (b. 1928)

18 July – Pedro Pérez, triple jumper (b. 1952).

References

 
2010s in Cuba
Years of the 21st century in Cuba
Cuba
Cuba